Psammomoya choretroides is a small shrub in the Celastraceae family, endemic to the south west of Western Australia. It was first described by Ferdinand von Mueller in 1889 as Logania choretroides, but was transferred to the genus, Psammomoya, in 1904 by Ludwig Diels and Ludwig Eduard Theodor Loesener.

Description
Mueller described it as follows:

Etymology
Mueller considered the plant to be like a Choretrum, and hence described it using the species epithet, choretroides ("Choretrum-like").

References

Further reading

Celastraceae
Taxa named by Ferdinand von Mueller